The 2021 Masters Endurance Legends was the fourth season of the Masters Endurance Legends. It began at Donington Park on 2 April and ended at Algarve International Circuit on 31 October.

Teams and drivers

Race results
Bold indicates overall winner.

Championships standings

References

External links

Masters Endurance Legends
Masters Endurance Legends